Lăpușna County may refer to:
 Lăpușna County (Moldova)
 Lăpușna County (Romania)